is a Japanese singer, stage actress and songwriter.

She has played the role of Kou Seiya in the Sailor Moon musicals. As a songwriter, she is known as Sayuri.

Personal life 
Sayuri studied at Horikoshi High School as a student, and knew Nana Mizuki there. Currently, she has written lyrics for several songs by Nana Mizuki.

Stage career 
Sayuri became the first actress to play Kou Seiya in the Sailor Moon musicals at the age of 17. Her first show was the 1996 Summer Special Musical Bishoujo Senshi Sailor Moon Sailor Stars. She continued to perform until the 1998 Winter Special Musical Bishoujo Senshi Sailor Moon Eien Densetsu (Kaiteiban) The Final First Stage!!.

Sayuri is the longest-running actress of Seiya Kou/Sailor Star Fighter, performing for 113 stages.

Discography

Singles 
  Paradise is Over  (released on 24 March 2004)
 Paradise is Over
 Composition: Eriko Yoshiki
 Arrangement: Takahiro Iida, Taichi Nakamura
 'Kingdom of Chaos' theme song
 'Steady x Study' ending theme
 No Where Girl
 Composition: Kei Yoshikawa
 Arrangement: Takahiro Iida, Taichi Nakamura
 'Steady x Study' opening theme

Albums 
 Chaos (released on 14 April 2004)
 Another Sky
 Composition: Yoshio Tatano
 Arrangement: Takahiro Iida, Kazuyoshi Baba
 'Shinten Makai Generation of Chaos IV' opening theme
 Paradise is Over
 Composition: Eriko Yoshiki
 Arrangement: Takahiro Iida, Taichi Nakamura
 'Kingdom of Chaos' theme song
 'Steady x Study' ending theme
 Intermission
 Composition: Takahiro Iida
 Arrangement: Takahiro Iida, Taichi Nakamura
 'Shinten Makai Generation of Chaos IV' insert song
 Fade Away
 Composition: Ruka Oba
 Arrangement: Takahiro Iida, Kazuyoshi Baba
 'Shinten Makai Generation of Chaos IV' ending theme
 No Where Girl
 Composition: Kei Yoshikawa
 Arrangement: Takahiro Iida, Taichi Nakamura
 'Steady x Study' opening theme

Songwriting

Songs by Nana Mizuki 
 Nostalgia (released on 14 November 2007 on Nana's album Great Activity)
 Composition: Tlast, Arrangement: Shinya Saito
 Soradokei (空時計) (released on 6 February 2008 on Nana's single Starcamp EP)
 Composition, arrangement: Tsutomu Ohira
 Gozen Rei-Ji no Baby Doll (午前0時のBaby Doll) (released on 21 January 2009 on Nana's single Shin'ai)
 Composition: Ryouhei Sugita, Arrangement: Nishi-ken
 Ending theme for radio show 
 Mr. Bunny! (released on 3 June 2009 on Nana's album Ultimate Diamond)
 Composition: Wakabayashi Makoto, Arrangement: Shinya Saito
 Strobe Cinema (ストロボシネマ) (released on 7 July 2010 on Nana's album Impact Exciter)
 Composition, arrangement: Shogo Ohnishi
 Ending theme for 
 High-Stepper (released on 13 April 2011 on Nana's single Scarlet Knight)
 Composition, arrangement: Shinya Saito
 Love Brick (released on 11 January 2011 on Nana's single Synchrogazer, lyrics jointly written with Nana Mizuki and meg rock)
 Composition, arrangement: Shinya Saito
 Party! Party! (released on 6 June 2012 on Nana's single Time Space EP)
 Composition, arrangement: Tajiri Tomoyuki

References

External links 
 Webkoo - Artists: Katayama Sayuri

Japanese actresses
Japanese songwriters
Japanese lyricists
Actors from Saga Prefecture
1979 births
Living people
Horikoshi High School alumni
Musicians from Saga Prefecture
21st-century Japanese singers
21st-century Japanese women singers